New Forest West is a constituency represented in the House of Commons of the UK Parliament since 1997 by Desmond Swayne, a Conservative.

Constituency profile
This constituency covers the part of the New Forest which is not covered by New Forest East, and southern coastal settlements just outside its boundaries. The largest settlements are Fordingbridge and Ringwood which are inland and coastal New Milton and Lymington.

For all areas the relevant local authority has a higher than average proportion of retired people, and a lower than national average extent of social housing and rented housing.  Housing types include far above average detached and semi-detached properties. Coast and forest are contained in this area.

Boundaries

1997–2010: The District of New Forest wards of Barton, Bashley, Becton, Bransgore and Sopley, Downlands, Fordingbridge, Forest North West, Forest West, Hordle, Lymington Town, Milford, Milton, Pennington, Ringwood North, Ringwood South, and Sway.

2010–present: The District of New Forest wards of Barton, Bashley, Becton, Bransgore and Burley, Buckland, Downlands and Forest, Fernhill, Fordingbridge, Forest North West, Hordle, Lymington Town, Milford, Milton, Pennington, Ringwood East and Sopley, Ringwood North, and Ringwood South.

History
This constituency was created when the old New Forest constituency was divided for the 1997 general election. Since its creation, election results suggest a Conservative safe seat.

Members of Parliament

Elections

2010s

2000s

1990s

See also
List of parliamentary constituencies in Hampshire

Notes

References

Sources
Election result, 2005 (BBC)
Election results, 1997 - 2001 (BBC)
Election results, 1997 - 2001 (Election Demon)
Election results, 1997 - 2005 (Guardian)

Parliamentary constituencies in Hampshire
Constituencies of the Parliament of the United Kingdom established in 1997
New Forest District